Lake Crescent is a deep lake located entirely within Olympic National Park in Clallam County, Washington, United States, approximately  west of Port Angeles on U.S. Route 101 and nearby to the small community of Piedmont. At an official maximum depth of  it is officially the second deepest lake in Washington (after Lake Chelan). A lake-wide bathymetric survey was performed from 2013 to 2014 by Eian Ray and Jeff Engea and the results of this survey showed the maximum depth as being 596 feet. Using GIS statistical analysis, this survey also showed the lake contains approximately 0.5 cubic miles of fresh water.

Lake Crescent is known for its brilliant blue waters and exceptional clarity, caused by a lack of nitrogen in the water which inhibits the growth of algae. It is located in a popular recreational area that is home to several trails, including the Spruce Railroad Trail, Pyramid Mountain trail, and the Barnes Creek trail to Marymere Falls. The Spruce Railroad Trail follows the grade of what was once the tracks of a logging railroad along the shores of the lake. Following this trail on the north side of the lake, one can find the entrance to an old railroad tunnel as well as "Devils Punch Bowl", a popular swimming and diving area.

Origins
The lake was formed when glaciers carved out deep valleys during the last Ice Age. Initially, the Lake Crescent valley drained into the Indian Creek valley and then into Elwha River. Anadromous fish such as steelhead and coastal cutthroat trout migrated into the valley from lower waters.

Approximately 8,000 years ago, a great landslide from one of the Olympic Mountains dammed Indian Creek, and the deep valley filled with water. Many geologists believe that Lake Crescent and nearby Lake Sutherland formed at the same time, but became separated by the landslide. This theory is supported by Klallum tribe legend which tells a story of Mount Storm King being angered by warring tribes and throwing a boulder to cut Lake Sutherland in two, resulting in Lake Crescent. The results of the landslide are easily visible from the summit of Pyramid Mountain. Eventually, the water found an alternative route out of the valley, spilling into the Lyre River, over the Lyre River Falls, and out to the Strait of Juan de Fuca.

Ecology
The anadromous fish populations in the lake became landlocked, because those fish could not ascend Lyre River Falls, making a barrier in that direction. Over time, two different subspecies of fish evolved in the lake: the endemic Beardslee trout, a relative of rainbow trout, spawns in the Lyre River above the falls, while the Crescenti Cutthroat Trout spawns in Barnes Creek.

Depth
In the early 1960s, the U.S. Navy surveyed the lake using a Furuno depth sounder. They were not able to verify the maximum depth of their equipment.

The Lake Crescent Bathymetric Survey: In 2013 and 2014, geographic data scientists Eian Ray and Jeff Enge performed a lake-wide bathymetric survey, taking over 5,000 depth soundings. Much of the shoreline of the lake drops off steeply, in many cases a sheer underwater cliff face.

History

It is not certain whether the lake was named for its crescent shape or for its proximity to Crescent Bay, which was named by Henry Kellett in 1846. In 1849 two British–Canadian fur trappers, John Sutherland and John Everett forged inland from Crescent Bay. The two lakes they found became known as Lake Sutherland and Everett Lake. Later, Everett Lake was renamed Lake Crescent. It has also been known as Big Lake and Elk Lake.

In 1890, while the Port Crescent Improvement Company was promoting its townsite near the lake, M.J. Carrigan started the Port Crescent Leader to help boost the town. He wrote of the beautiful lake, which he called Lake Crescent, and the name soon became well-established.

The lake was included in the Olympic Forest Reserve in 1897, designated as a recreation area in 1921, and finally included in Olympic National Park in 1938.

Notable incidents

In 1929, Russell and Blanch Warren disappeared while driving in the vicinity of Lake Crescent. Their whereabouts remained unknown until 2002 when their 1927 Chevrolet automobile was found over  beneath the surface of Lake Crescent. Also, in 1937, a waitress named Hallie Illingworth went missing and was found three years later by local fishermen. She was apparently weighted down, and over time her restraints had decayed, allowing her corpse to float to the surface. The corpse was completely preserved by the near-freezing lake temperature. Her skin had turned into a substance described as "ivory soap," which was caused by minerals in the lake water interacting with Illingworth's body fat in a process called saponification. Her husband, Montgomery J. "Monty" Illingworth, was later convicted of the murder. He served nine years in prison until he was paroled in 1951.

See also
Steamboats of Lake Crescent, Washington
Barnes Point
Kloshe Nanitch Lookout

References

Sources

External links 

Olympic National Park (National Park Service)
Visiting Lake Crescent
The allure of Lake Crescent never grows old Article from the Seattle Post-Intelligencer.
The Evergreen Playground University of Washington Libraries Digital Collections. Online museum exhibit that highlights the history of tourism on the Olympic Peninsula, including the development of the Olympic Loop Highway (U.S. Highway 101) and the Olympic National Park. Includes many images of Lake Crescent.
History Around Lake Crescent, Clallam County, Washington By Andrew Craig Magnuson.

Crescent
Crescent
Landforms of Olympic National Park
Protected areas of Clallam County, Washington
Crescent